William Bruce, 8th Earl of Kincardine  (died 8 September 1740), the son of Thomas Bruce, 7th Earl of Kincardine and Rachel Paunceforth, became the 8th Lord of Torry and the 8th Earl of Kincardine in 1740.

His wife was Janet Roberton, the daughter of James Roberton, a Lord of Session (in turn a grandson of James Roberton, Lord Bedlay an ordinary Lord of Session during the Restoration.) and his wife Euphemia Burnett.

The couple were second cousins, both descendants of Robert Bruce, Lord Broomhill. Bruce's descent was through his father Thomas Bruce 7th Earl of Kincardine and his grandfather Alexander 4th Earl of Kincardine. His wife's mother was the daughter of Janet Bruce, Alexander's sister. 
Bruce had five children:

Lady Christian Bruce d. 1810 ar. 28 Apr 1762 James Erskine of Cardross
Lt-General James Thomas Bruce M.P. for Marlborough 1796 and Great Bedwyn 1796–1797 (d. 12 Dec 1797) 
Charles Bruce 9th Earl of Kincardine (who later succeeded as the 5th Earl of Elgin) 
Rev Hon. James Bruce b. 1865
Lady Rachel Bruce m. 1778 John Milnes Esq. d. 1803

His son Charles Bruce inherited the Earldom of Elgin from the extinct line of Charles Bruce, the 3rd Earl of Ailesbury and 4th Earl of Elgin by virtue of their descent from Sir George Bruce, younger brother of Edward, the 1st Lord of Kinloss

References

1740 deaths
8
Year of birth unknown